Didier Ruef (born 1961) is a Swiss documentary photographer best known for his portrayal of man and waste, recycle and sustainability, Africa, man and animals, Swiss alpine farmers and contemporary Switzerland.

Life and career
Didier Ruef was born in Geneva, Switzerland on July 15, 1961. He graduated from the University of Geneva, where he studied Economics (1981–1984).

In 1985, Ruef went to New York, where he obtained a diploma (1986) in photojournalism at the International Center of Photography (ICP). It was there that he developed his long-term essay of the life of a Puerto Rican family in Spanish Harlem, for which he won the Yann Geoffroy Prize in Milan in 1990. These photographs were exhibited at the Musée de l'Élysée in Lausanne, Switzerland, in 1990.

Since returning to Switzerland in 1987, Ruef started to work as a freelance documentary photographer and photojournalist and has visited all five continents, with a preference for Africa. He has worked on various stories on the human condition in black & white and color.

Ruef was a member of Network Photographers Agency in London from 1991 to 1997. He was a founding member in September 2002 of the Swiss photo agency, Pixsil, which he left in July 2009. Today he works as a freelance photographer, but he is also represented worldwide by the photo agencies Luz Photo Agency, Visum Foto and Redux Pictures.

Ruef has worked with Médecins Sans Frontières, the Global Fund to fight AIDS, tuberculosis and malaria, Heks (Interchurch Aid), Swiss Red Cross, the Syngenta Foundation and the World Council of Churches.

Ruef's pictures are published in numerous magazines and newspapers in Europe, Asia and Northern America.

He won the King Albert Memorial Foundation Prize in 2000 for his book on Swiss mountain farmers (Bauern am Berg, Paysans de nos montagnes, Vita di montagna). This award, among other prizes, was the culmination of a long-term personal project which began in 1993 and completed in 1997. It was made possible with the support of Pro Helvetia for the photography and book in 1998, and an itinerant exhibition which toured Switzerland, Italy, Singapore and Jordan between 1999 and 2002.

In 2000 and 2001, Ruef was commissioned by the Swiss branch of Médecins Sans Frontières (MSF) for an extensive photographic report on daily life in six African countries. These pictures, together with those from numerous other African essays form the basis of a book Afrique Noire, published in 2005. An itinerant exhibition toured Switzerland and France between 2005 and 2007.

In 2007, he was commissioned by the Swiss Foundation DiDé, Dignité en Détention, for a book Enfants Prisonniers on the minors’ jail in Gitarama, Rwanda.

From 1991 to 2011, he has also been involved in a personal project worldwide on the relationship between Man and Waste. He has shot twenty photo essays and has finally published in 2011 the book Recycle, Labor et Fides (French-English) and Edizioni Casagrande (Italian-German). In 2018, he has published the book Homo Helveticus by Till Schaap Edition on his beloved country Switzerland.

In 2021, he has published the book 2020. by Till Schaap Edition in which he shot a picture a day - 366 images - during the entire 2020 year.

Awards
 Swiss Press Photo 21. Third prize for the Swiss Stories. 2021
 Deutscher Fotobuchpreis. Nomination 2012
 Swiss Press Photo. First prize for the foreign section. 2006
 Fujifilm Euro Press Photo Awards. Swiss prize for the technique section. 2004
 Swiss Press Photo. First prize for the foreign section. 2003
 Swiss Press Photo. First and third prizes for the foreign section. 2002
 King Albert Memorial Foundation for the book Bauern am Berg, OZV Offizin Zürich Verlag. Switzerland. 2000
 Schweizerische Arbeitsgemeinschaft für die Berggebiete (SAB) Switzerland for the book Bauern am Berg OZV Offizin Zürich Verlag. Switzerland. 1999
 Passy's mountain book fair, France, for the book Paysans de nos montagnes, Editions Monographic. 1999
 Honorable mention. UNESCO. Japan. 1993
 Applied Arts Magazine Awards Annual. USA. 1993
 Third black&white prize. Nikon International. Japan. 1991
 Yann Geoffroy. Agenzia Grazia Neri.  Milan. Italy. 1990
 Second color prize. Nikon International. Japan. 1989
 Grand Prix. L'Illustré. Switzerland. 1983

Books
 2020. Till Schaap Edition. Switzerland. 2021
 Homo Helveticus. Till Schaap Edition. Switzerland. 2018
 Iași – Puncte de vedere. Iași Editura Muzeelor Literare.Iași. Romania. 2015
 Afrika, letzte Hoffnung. (Reprint with a new book cover). Pier Paolo Pasolini. Mit Fotografien von Didier Ruef. Corso. Hamburg. Germany. 2015
 Bestiarium. QTI. Stabio. Switzerland. 2012
 Afrika, letzte Hoffnung. Corso. Hamburg. Germany. 2011
 Recycle. Labor et Fides. Switzerland. 2011
 Recycle. Casagrande Edizioni. Switzerland. 2011
 Enfants Prisonniers. Fondation DiDé, Dignité en Détention. Geneva. Switzerland. 2007
 Afrique Noire. Infolio Editions. Switzerland. 2005
 Tausendundein Krieg. NP Buchverlag. Austria. 2004
 Vita di montagna Edizioni Casagrande. Switzerland. 1998
 Paysans de nos montagnes. Editions Monographic. Switzerland. 1998
 Bauern am Berg OZV Offizin Zürich Verlag. Switzerland. 1998
 Weltenblicke. Reportagefotografie und ihre Medien OZV Offizin Zürich Verlag. Switzerland.1997

Collections
 Black Gold Museum. Riyadh, Kingdom of Saudia
 Collezione della Republica e Cantone Ticino. Switzerland.
 Collection Charles-Henri Favrod, Saint-Prex. Switzerland.
 Fonds cantonal d’art contemporain, Geneva. Switzerland.
 Fondation MAST, Bologna, Italy 
 Fonds pour la photographie, Geneva. Switzerland.
 Musée de l'Élysée, Lausanne, Switzerland.
 Museo Casa Cavalier Pellanda. Biasca. Switzerland.
 Schweizerische Stiftung für die Photographie, Zürich. Switzerland.

Exhibits

Individuals
 1990
Médecins Sans Frontières in Uganda. Maison du Grütli, Geneva. Switzerland.
 1991
Spanish Harlem. Family Life. Musée de l'Élysée, Lausanne. Switzerland.
 1993
Gens de la Voirie. MJC St.-Gervais, Geneva. Switzerland.
 1998
Bauern am Berg. Völkerkundemuseum, Zürich. Switzerland.
 1999
Vita di montagna. Castelgrande, Bellinzona. Switzerland.
"Paysans de nos montagnes." Caves de la maison de Courten, Sierre (Switzerland).
 2000
Bauern am Berg. Museo Nazionale del San Gottardo. Switzerland.
Paysans de nos montagnes. Galerie Focale, Nyon. Switzerland.
 2001
Paysans de montagnes. The Substation. Singapore.
 Vita di montagna. CCS Centro Culturale Svizzero, Milan. Italy.
Vita di montagna. Forte di Nago, Torbole. Italy.
 2002
Mountain farming. The Jordan National Gallery of Fine Arts, Amman. Jordan.
 2005
Africa Nera. Museo d’arte, Mendrisio. Switzerland
Afrique Noire. Galerie Focale, Nyon. Switzerland.
Schwarzafrica. Coalmine Gallery, Winterthur. Switzerland.
 2006
Afrique Noire. Itinéraires des Photographes Voyageurs, Bibliothèque Municipale, Bordeaux. France.
 2007
Afrique Noire. Völkerkundemuseum. Zürich. Switzerland.
 2013
Animals’ World. Leica Gallery. Zingst. Germany.
 2014
Animals’ World. Leica Galerie Salzburg, Austria
Les déchets dans le monde. Printemps de l'environnement: réduisons, réutilisons, recyclons. Ville de Palaiseau. France.
 2016
72 boulevard des écorchés. Cité Séniors, Geneva. Switzerland
 2019
 Homo Helveticus. Artespressione Gallery, Milan. Italy.

Group
 1986
Central Park. New York. USA.
 1988
Triennale internationale de la Photographie. Fribourg. Switzerland.
 1991
Voir la Suisse Autrement. Switzerland's 700rd Anniversary. Fribourg. Switzerland.
 1993
World Press Photo. World Tour.
Picture Freedom. Photographers Gallery, London. England.
 1994
Migracoes. Museu da Imagem e do Som (MIS), São Paulo. Brazil.
UNESCO / Accu . World Tour.
 1997
Weltenblicke. Reportagefotografie und ihre Medien. Fotomuseum Winterthur. Switzerland.
De Ketting V. Photofestival Noorderlicht, Ja Groningen. The Netherlands.
 1999
O seculo do corpo. Trabalhos fotograficos 1990-1999. Culturgest, Lisbonne. Portugal.
 2003
Objective : People's world. WHO, Tirana. Albania.
Le monde selon Focale . Villa Dutoit, Geneva. Switzerland.
 2006
Switzerland by Focale's photographers. La Gallerie Photo, Montpellier. France.
Liberté, Freiheit, Libertà. Reporters Sans Frontières (RSF). Travelling exhibit around Switzerland.
 2007
Focale's 25 years . Château de Nyon. Switzerland.
Malnutrition's sensibilisation. Médecins Sans Frontières France. Lille. France.
 2010
 Black Africa – Rwanda, Enfants Prisonniers. 10th Shanghai International Photographic Art Exhibition. Exhibition Center of Shanghai. China.
 2011
 Un mondo di persone (Objective : People's world. WHO). Spazio Villas, Parco di San Giovanni. Trieste. Italy.
 2012
 12x7. Museo Casa Cavalier Pellanda. Biasca. Switzerland. 
 Vestiges. Le Manoir de la Ville de Martigny. Switzerland. 
 2013
 Collection Charles-Henri Favrod. Saint-Imier Museum. Switzerland. 
 Bestiarium. Umweltfotofestival Horizonte Zingst. Germany.
 Des Images pour la liberté d’expression. RSF (Reporters Sans frontières). SIG. Geneva. Switzerland.
 Des Images pour la liberté d’expression. RSF (Reporters Sans frontières). LuganoPhotoDays. Lugano. Switzerland.
 2014
 Recycle. Umweltfotofestival Horizonte Zingst. Germany.
 Rwanda. Minors in detention. LuganoPhotosDays. October 17–26. Lugano. Switzerland.
 2015
 Sonntag Nachmittag in der Schweiz. Seebad Seewesen. Switzerland. 
 Recycled. Villa Dutoit. Geneva. Switzerland.
 2016
 Révélations. Photographies à Genève. Musée Rath. Geneva. Switzerland. 
 2017
 Sulle vie dell'illuminazione Il mito dell'India nella cultura occidentale 1808-2017. MASI Lugano. Switzerland. 
 2019
 Homo Helveticus. Umweltfotofestival Horizonte Zingst. Germany.

Lectures
 7 October 2021. "2020". Musée de l'appareil photographique, Vevey (in French). Musée de l'appareil photographique, Vevey. Switzerland.
 1 October 2021. "2020". Photobastei (in German). Photobastei Zürich, Switzerland.
 30 September 2021. "2020". BelleVue - Ort for Fotografie (in English). Basel, Switzerland.
 15 June 2019. "Homo Helveticus". Carona Immagina (in Italian). Ticino, Switzerland.
 30 May 2019. "Homo Helveticus". Umweltfotofestival Horizonte Zingst (in German). Germany.
 13 April 2019. "Recycle". Festival dell’Ambiente e della sostenibilità (in Italian). Verdi Theatre. Milan. Italy.
 11 April 2019. "Homo Helveticus". (in French). Société de Lecture. Geneva, Switzerland..
 29 March 2019. "Reporters Unplugged". Festival Histoire et Cité. Uni Dufour, salle U600 (in French). Geneva. Switzerland.
 12 December 2018. "Vita di Montagna". Festival letterario “Leggere le Montagne” (in Italian). Verdi Theatre. Milan. Italy.
 12 November 2018. "Sostenibilità nel prisma della fotografia". Università degli studi di Milano (in Italian). Milan. Italy.
 21 September 2016. "Sostenibilità e fotografia" with Roberto Antonini (RSI journalist). LuganoPhotoDays (in Italian). Lugano. Switzerland.
 31 October 2015. "Recycle". Villa Dutoit (in French). Geneva. Switzerland.
 16 October 2013. "Recycle". LuganoPhotoDays (in Italian). Lugano. Switzerland.
 27 October 2012. "Fotogiornalismo oggi". Museo Casa Cavalier Pellanda (in Italian). Biasca. Switzerland.
 3 April 2012. "Recycle". Société de lecture (in French). Geneva. Switzerland.
 26 October 2011. "Recycle". International Center of Photography (in English). New York City. USA
 6 October 2011. "Recycle". Lecture for the participants of Unigestion Client conference (in English). Unigestion is a leading independent asset manager. Vevey. Switzerland
 7 May 2011. "Recycle". Chiasso Letteraria (in Italian). Galleria Cons Arc. Switzerland.
 5 April 2011. "The meaning of photography today" (in German). Canon Switzerland. “Händler Schulung Programm”. Zürich. Switzerland.
 22 and 29 September 2010. "A personal view on being a photographer" (in French). Canon Switzerland. “Creative Days Lausanne and Geneva”. Switzerland.

Workshops
 2018
Albania. Travel workshop. May 19–27. Albania.
L'art de l'editing photographique. Leica Akademie Switzerland. Humanit’Art gallery. September 1. Geneva. Switzerland.
Italy. Apulia and Matera. Travel workshop. December 5–9. Italy.
 2017
Master Class at "Academy of Arts, University of Novi Sad". April 26–27. Novi Sad. Serbia.
 2016
LuganoPhotosDays. "Visual Storytelling. The art of reportage". November 12–13. Lugano. Switzerland.
 2015
Master Class at "MAZ". March 2–6. Five days. Luzern. Switzerland.
 2014
Fotofestival Horizonte Zings. "Fotografie mit einem Augenzwinkern". May 28–29. Zingst. Germany.
LuganoPhotosDays. "Documentary Photography: Just be yourself." October 18–19/25-26. Four days. Lugano. Switzerland.
 2013
LuganoPhotosDays. October 12–17. Five days. Lugano. Switzerland.
 2005
University of Tulsa. "Photojournalism" October 2005. Three days. University of Tulsa. Photo department. Oklahoma. USA.
CEPV. "Photojournalism". Spring 2005. Five days. Centre d’Enseignement Professionel Vevey (CEPV). Switzerland
 2002
Amman."Photojournalism". One day at The Jordan National Gallery of Fine Arts Amman. Jordan.

References
 2020. Til Schaap Edition. Switzerland. 2021. 
 Swiss Press Photo 21. Steidl. Germany. 2021. 
 Inspiration Leica Akademie. Rheinwerk, Germany.2020. 
 Swiss Press Photo 20. Till Schaap Edition. Switzerland. 2020. 
 Swiss Press Photo 19. Till Schaap Edition. Switzerland. 2019. 
 Homo Helveticus. Til Schaap Edition. Switzerland. 2018. 
 On the Paths of Enlightenment The myth of India in Western Culture 1808-2017. MASI Lugano. Skira. Italy. 2017. 
 Sulle vie dell'illuminazione Il mito dell'India nella cultura occidentale 1808-2017. MASI Lugano. Skira. Italy. 2017. 
 Swiss Press Photo 17. Till Schaap Edition. Switzerland. 2017. 
 25 Swiss Press Photo. Till Schaap Edition. Switzerland. 2016. 
 Swiss Press Photo 16. Till Schaap Edition. Switzerland. 2016. 
 Afrika, letzte Hoffnung. Corso. Germany. 2011. 
 Masterworks of industrial photography. Exhibitions 2013-2014. Mast Foundation.. MAST. Electa. Italy. 2015. 
 Iași – Puncte de vedere. Iași Editura Muzeelor Literare.Iași. Romania. 2015. 
 Swiss Press Photo 15. Benteli. Switzerland. 2015. 
 LuganoPhotoDays 2014. LuganoPhotoDays. Lugano. Switzerland. 2014. 
 Horizonte Zingst 2014. Seetownpublishingzingst. Kur-und Tourismus Gmbh Zingst. Germany. 2014. 
 Swiss Press Photo 14. Benteli. Switzerland. 2014. 
 Horizonte Zingst 2013. Seetownpublishingzingst. Kur-und Tourismus Gmbh Zingst. Germany. 2013. 
 Tout ça. De la collection de Charles-Henri Favrod. Bernard Campiche Editeur. Switzerland. 2012. 
 Dodicisette. Edizioni Salvioni. Switzerland. 2012. 
 Bestiarium. QTI. Switzerland. 2012. 
 Afrika, letzte Hoffnung. Corso. Germany. 2011. 
 Recycle. Labor et Fides. Switzerland. 2011. 
 Recycle. Edizioni Casagrande. Switzerland. 2011.  
 GR Snaps II. Trout. Japan. 2010. 
 Swiss Press Photo 09. Benteli. Switzerland. 2009. 
 Swiss Press Photo 08. Benteli. Switzerland. 2008. 
 Swiss Press Photo 07. Benteli. Switzerland. 2007. 
 The eye of Switzerland. 15 years of Swiss Press Photo. Benteli. Switzerland. 2006. 
 Swiss Press Photo 06. Benteli. Switzerland. 2006. 
 Liberté. Freiheit. Libertà. Editions Reporters Sans Frontières, Switzerland. 2005. 
 Tausendundein Krieg. Begegnungen am Persichen Golf. Ulrich Ladurner, Didier Ruef. NP Buchverlag. Austria. 2004. 
 Afrique Noire. Infolio Editions. Switzerland. 2005. 
 Swiss Press Photo 03. Benteli. Switzerland. 2003. 
 Swiss Press Photo 02. Benteli. Switzerland. 2002. 
 Bauern am Berg. Offizin, Zürich. Ulrich Ladurner, Didier Ruef. 1998. 
 Paysans de nos montagnes. Editions Monographic. Ulrich Ladurner, Didier Ruef. 1998. 
 Vita di montagna. Didier Ruef, Ulrich Ladurner. Edizioni Casagrande. Switzerland. 1998.

Notes

External links
  Didier Ruef. Official website.
  Didier Ruef Workshops.

Swiss photojournalists
Living people
1961 births
20th-century Swiss photographers
21st-century Swiss photographers
Photographers from Geneva